A Gem of a Jam is a 1943 short subject directed by Del Lord starring American slapstick comedy team The Three Stooges (Moe Howard, Larry Fine and Curly Howard). It is the 76th entry in the series released by Columbia Pictures starring the comedians, who released 190 shorts for the studio between 1934 and 1959.

Plot
The Stooges are janitors in a doctor's office working the night shift. The usual antics occur, first with Moe getting an electrical shock down his pants, leading to a cossack dance. Then, Curly gets his head wedged inside a fish bowl, containing a live fish. Though Moe and Larry eventually slide the bowl off, Curly starts to feel the swallowed fish tickling his insides. Moe manages to fish the aquatic critter out of Curly.

Outside, a crook on the lam is shot in the arm while trying to make a getaway after a robbery. The thugs bring their hurt leader (John Tyrrell) up to the Stooges, thinking the doctor's office is open for business. The boys play doctor and promptly anesthetize the wounded crook with a rubber mallet. Then, the wounded crook slides off the gurney and out the window while the Stooges' backs are turned. As luck would have it, the crook lands right into a police car waiting below at street level. The other crooks flee when they see the Stooges mangled the situation, only to be captured by the policemen.

The trio, meanwhile, take cover in a spooky storage area, replete with a huge jack-in-the-box, and a scared night watchman (Dudley Dickerson). Curly is so terrified that he stumbles into a trough filled with fast-drying plaster, making him virtually immobile. As a consequence, the poor, ghostly-looking Stooge ends up scaring all involved.

Production notes
A Gem of a Jam was filmed on June 12–16, 1943. The Stooges released more short subjects in 1943 than any other year at Columbia Pictures, A Gem of a Jam being the tenth entry.

The gag of Curly stepping out of a trough appearing as a ghost first appeared in the 1934 Laurel and Hardy film The Live Ghost. When the night watchman (Dudley Dickerson) backs into the mannequin, he shouts, "I'm losing my mind!" This line, however, has been muted for television broadcasts and home video releases.

References

External links
 
 
A Gem of a Jam at threestooges.net

1943 films
The Three Stooges films
American black-and-white films
Films directed by Del Lord
1943 comedy films
Columbia Pictures short films
American slapstick comedy films
1943 short films
1940s English-language films
1940s American films